Sacramental wine, Communion wine, altar wine, or wine for consecration is wine obtained from grapes and intended for use in celebration of the Eucharist (also referred to as the Lord's Supper or Holy Communion, among other names). It is usually consumed after sacramental bread.

History
Wine was used in the earliest celebrations of the Lord's Supper. Paul the Apostle writes in 1 Corinthians 10:16:

In the Early Church, both clergy and laity received the consecrated wine by drinking from the chalice, after receiving a portion of the consecrated bread. Due to many factors, including the difficulty of obtaining wine in Northern European countries (where the climate was unsuitable for viticulture), drinking from the chalice became largely restricted in the West to the celebrating priest, while others received communion only in the form of bread. This also reduced the symbolic importance of choosing wine of red colour.

Eastern Churches in full communion with the Holy See continued to give the Eucharist to the faithful under both forms. The twentieth century—especially after the Second Vatican Council—saw a return to more widespread sharing in the Eucharist under the forms of both bread and wine. In the Anglican Communion (of which the Church of England and the Episcopal Church of the United States of America are members), the use of wine is obligatory in the celebration of Holy Communion; however, a person receiving communion makes a valid communion even if they receive only in one kind (i.e., either just the bread or just the wine). For example, a sick person who can only take liquids makes a valid communion by receiving the wine.

In the Eastern Orthodox Church, the clergy continued to receive the consecrated wine by drinking directly from the chalice, but in order to avoid the danger of accidentally spilling some of the Blood of Christ the practice was developed of placing the consecrated Body of Christ in the chalice and administering Holy Communion to the faithful, under both species with a sacramental spoon.

Composition 

The majority of liturgical churches, such as the Catholic Church and Eastern Orthodox Church, require that sacramental wine should be pure grape wine. Other Christian churches, such as the Methodist Churches, disapprove of the consumption of alcohol, and substitute grape juice for wine (see Christian views on alcohol).

In Eastern Christianity, sacramental wine is usually red, to better symbolize its change from wine into the blood of Jesus Christ, as is believed to happen at the Eucharist. In the Eastern Orthodox Church, for example, sacramental wine used in the Divine Liturgy must usually be fermented pure sweet red grape wine. The Greek Orthodox Church favours the use of Mavrodaphne or Nama, while the Russian Orthodox Church favours Kagor. Wines with additives, such as retsina and high fructose corn syrup, are not allowed. In Western Christianity, white wine is also sometimes used for the practical purpose of avoiding stains on the altar cloths.

In most liturgical rites, such as the Roman, Byzantine, Antiochene, and Alexandrian, a small quantity of water is added to the wine when the chalice is prepared, while in the Armenian Rite the wine is consecrated without the previous mingling of water. In the Byzantine Rite some hot water, referred to as the zeon (Greek: "boiling"), is added to the consecrated wine shortly before the Communion. Originally common practice in the ancient Mediterranean, this ritual has been accorded multiple symbolic meanings, such as the mystery of Christ's human and divine natures, his unity with the Church, and the flow of blood and water from Christ's side at his death.

Catholicism 

Over the centuries, various criteria were laid down for wine to be appropriate for use in the Eucharist. Editions of the Tridentine Roman Missal had a section De Defectibus on defects which could occur in the celebration of Mass, including defects of the wine. Canon 924 of the present Code of Canon Law (1983) states:

§1 The most holy Sacrifice of the Eucharist must be celebrated in bread, and in wine to which a small quantity of water is to be added. 
§2 The bread must be wheaten only, and recently made, so that there is no danger of corruption.
§3 The wine must be natural, made from grapes of the vine, and not corrupt.

This means that the wine must be naturally fermented with nothing added to it, and the wine itself cannot have soured or become vinegar, nor can it have anything artificial added to it (preservatives, flavours). While the Catholic Church generally adheres to the rule that all wine for sacramental use must be pure grape wine and alcoholic it is accepted that there are some circumstances, where it may be necessary to use a wine that is only minimally fermented, called mustum.

One exception was historically made regarding wine-derived additives to wine. An 1896 directive of the Congregation of the Inquisition stated:
To conserve weak and feeble wines, and in order to keep them from souring or spoiling during transportation, a small quantity of spirits of wine (grape brandy or alcohol) may be added, provided the following conditions are observed:
 The added spirit (alcohol) must have been distilled from the grape (ex genimime vitis);
 the quantity of alcohol added, together with that which the wine contained naturally after fermentation, must not exceed eighteen per cent of the whole;
 the addition must be made during the process of fermentation.

Methodism 
Methodist denominations use non-alcoholic wine (i.e. grape juice) in the sacrament. The 1916 rubric in the Discipline of the Methodist Episcopal Church, which has influenced descendant Methodist connexions, states: "Let the pure, unfermented juice of the grape be used in administering the Lord's Supper."

Manner of consumption 

In the Roman Rite of the Catholic Church, Communion is administered under the form of wine either by the communicant drinking directly from the chalice or by intinction. In the latter manner, the priest partially dips the consecrated bread into the consecrated wine and then places it in the mouth of the communicant.

Editions of the Roman Missal issued between 1970 and 2000 envisaged also use of a silver tube (Latin: fistula) with which, as with a "straw", to drink from the chalice, or of a spoon as in the Byzantine Rite.

In the Byzantine Rite of the Eastern Orthodox Church and some Eastern Catholic Churches the normal method is to use a spoon to give the communicant some of the consecrated wine together with a portion of the consecrated bread that has been placed in the chalice.

In the Anglican Church, the wine is normally consumed with each communicant receiving a small sip of it as the chalice is held by another person. This is often referred to as "the common cup".

Industry
Throughout the world there are some wineries that exist either solely for the production of sacramental wines, or with sacramental wines as an auxiliary business. The same is true of wine used by other religions, e.g., kosher wine. These wineries are small and often run by religious brothers, priests or dedicated laity.

In Australia, for example, Australian Jesuits founded the oldest existing winery in the Clare Valley in 1851 to make sacramental wines. The oldest vineyard founded for sacramental wine, still producing in the United States, is O-Neh-Da Vineyard in the Finger Lakes wine region of New York State, founded in 1872 by Bernard John McQuaid, the bishop of Rochester.

See also

 Blood of Christ
 Chalice
 Christian views on alcohol
 Religion and alcohol
 Sacramental bread
 Vin santo
 Hamra (Mandaeism)

References

Eucharistic objects
Religious food and drink
Christian terminology
Christianity and alcohol
Wine culture